Global Electric Motorcars (GEM) is an American manufacturer in the low-speed vehicle category, producing neighborhood electric vehicles (NEVs) since 1998 and low-speed vehicles (LSVs) since 2001. It has sold more than 50,000 GEM battery-electric vehicles worldwide . GEM was formerly owned by Chrysler. It was purchased by Polaris Inc. in 2011, and became a wholly owned subsidiary of Waev in January 2022 .

History

The company was founded in 1992 by a team of ex-General Motors engineers from Livonia, Michigan, under the name Trans2.

The company was purchased by a group of North Dakota investors and was moved to Fargo, North Dakota. Less than two months later, the National Highway Traffic Safety Administration (NHTSA) designated a new class of motor vehicle, the low-speed vehicle, also known as the Neighborhood Electric Vehicle (NEV). This allowed GEM cars to be driven on public roads if they met certain safety criteria such as having safety belts, headlamps, windshield wipers, and safety glass. 

They are battery-electric, operate on a 72-volt battery system and plug into a standard 3-prong 120-volt outlet for recharging, and fully recharge in six to eight hours.

There are currently six different models of GEM cars available primarily suited for intra-city use. GEM cars are used by local, state and national government agencies, resorts, master-planned communities, universities, medical and corporate campuses, as well as by sports teams, taxi-shuttle services, and by the general public.

Timeline

 April 1998
 First GEM car produced in Fargo, North Dakota
 October 1998
 GEM eL first produced
 November 1998
 GEM eS first produced
 December 1998
 GEM e4 first produced
 December 2000
 DaimlerChrysler Corporation acquires Global Electric Motorcars, LLC
March 2004
2005 models begin production
June 2005
Global Electric Motorcars receives its ISO 9001 Certification
January 2006
GEM has 150 dealers
April 2006
GEM e6 first produced
December 2007
Global Electric Motorcars celebrates its 10th Anniversary
GEM eL XD first produced
June 2009 
Global Electric Motorcars remains a wholly owned subsidiary of Chrysler Group LLC
June 2010 
Global Electric Motorcars introduces the new Right Hand Drive GEM electric vehicle
July 2011 
Global Electric Motorcars is sold to Polaris
August 2014 
GEM receives first minor refresh under new owners Polaris
GEM eM1400 utility vehicle first produced
October 2015 
GEM eM1400 LSV first produced
October 2016 
GEM launches full redesign of e2, e4, e6, & eLXD models including lithium-ion battery offerings

Vehicles
, the GEM neighborhood electric vehicle is the market leader in North America, with global sales of more than 50,000 units since 1998.
Passenger Vehicles:
 GEM e2 LSV — A two-passenger vehicle
 GEM e4 LSV — A four-passenger vehicle
 GEM e6 LSV — A six-passenger vehicle
Utility Vehicles:
 GEM eLXD LSV— A heavier duty version of the GEM with a  bed, which comes in several different configurations, and a  cargo capacity.
 GEM eM1400 LSV— A heavy duty GEM based on the Polaris ranger with a  bed with a  payload capacity.

Gallery

References

External links

 

Vehicle manufacturing companies established in 1992
Battery electric vehicle manufacturers
Companies based in Fargo–Moorhead
Car manufacturers of the United States
Low-speed vehicles
Electric vehicle manufacturers of the United States
Manufacturing companies based in Minnesota
Manufacturing companies based in North Dakota